Joculator is a genus of minute sea snails, marine gastropod molluscs in the family Cerithiopsidae. This genus was described by Hedley in 1909.

Species
Species in the genus Joculator include:

 Joculator abbreviatus (Thiele, 1930)
 Joculator acuminatus Cecalupo & Perugia, 2012
 Joculator aeneus Cecalupo & Perugia, 2017
 Joculator albordina Laseron, 1956
 Joculator albulus (Thiele, 1930)
 Joculator alligatus Cecalupo & Perugia, 2012
 Joculator anconae Cecalupo & Perugia, 2017
 Joculator angustus Cecalupo & Perugia, 2017
 Joculator antonioi Cecalupo & Perugia, 2012
 Joculator aoreensis Cecalupo & Perugia, 2013
 Joculator arduinii Cecalupo & Perugia, 2012
 Joculator arenaceus Cecalupo & Perugia, 2013
 Joculator ariadnae Cecalupo & Perugia, 2018
 Joculator ater Cecalupo & Perugia, 2012
 Joculator aterrufus Cecalupo & Perugia, 2019
 Joculator autumnus Cecalupo & Perugia, 2016
 Joculator bangkaensis Cecalupo & Perugia, 2019
 Joculator baraggiai Cecalupo & Perugia, 2013
 Joculator barteri Cecalupo & Perugia, 2018
 Joculator barteri Cecalupo & Perugia, 2018
 Joculator bauquisi Cecalupo & Perugia, 2017
 Joculator berberiani Cecalupo & Perugia, 2018
 Joculator bicinctus Cecalupo & Perugia, 2012
 Joculator boguszae Cecalupo & Perugia, 2018
 Joculator bourgeoisae Cecalupo & Perugia, 2013
 Joculator boguszae Cecalupo & Perugia, 2018
 Joculator bouteti Cecalupo & Perugia, 2014
 Joculator brabantae Cecalupo & Perugia, 2013
 Joculator breviculus Cecalupo & Perugia, 2017
 Joculator brevis Cecalupo & Perugia, 2012
 Joculator brucei (Melvill & Standen, 1912)
 Joculator brusonii Cecalupo & Perugia, 2013
 Joculator caliginosus Cecalupo & Perugia, 2012
 Joculator caloi Cecalupo & Perugia, 2013
 Joculator carpatinus Cecalupo & Perugia, 2012
 Joculator castaneus Cecalupo & Perugia, 2013
 Joculator cereus Cecalupo & Perugia, 2012
 Joculator christiaensi Jay & Drivas, 2002
 Joculator cinctus Cecalupo & Perugia, 2012
 Joculator citrinus Cecalupo & Perugia, 2013
 Joculator coffeus Cecalupo & Perugia, 2013
 Joculator conformis Cecalupo & Perugia, 2013
 Joculator continens Laseron, 1956
 Joculator corneliae Cecalupo & Perugia, 2018
 Joculator cossignanii Cecalupo & Perugia, 2012
 Joculator cristinae Cecalupo & Perugia, 2013
 Joculator czubai Cecalupo & Perugia, 2018
 Joculator dakoi Cecalupo & Perugia, 2018
 † Joculator decapitatus Grant-Mackie & Chapman-Smith, 1971 
 Joculator desmieri Cecalupo & Perugia, 2018
 Joculator diversus Cecalupo & Perugia, 2019
 Joculator drivasi Cecalupo & Perugia, 2012
 Joculator dupouxae Cecalupo & Perugia, 2018
 Joculator emidioi Cecalupo & Perugia, 2014
 Joculator erianae Cecalupo & Perugia, 2017
 Joculator eudeli Jay & Drivas, 2002
 Joculator faninozi Cecalupo & Perugia, 2018
 Joculator fedosovi Cecalupo & Perugia, 2018
 Joculator ferrii Cecalupo & Perugia, 2013
 Joculator ferrugineus Cecalupo & Perugia, 2012
 Joculator filum Cecalupo & Perugia, 2017
 Joculator fischeri Jay & Drivas, 2002
 Joculator flindersi Cotton, 1951
 Joculator flavicans Cecalupo & Perugia, 2014
 Joculator frequens Cecalupo & Perugia, 2012
 Joculator fulvaster Cecalupo & Perugia, 2019
 Joculator furvus Cecalupo & Perugia, 2012
 Joculator fuscostriatus Cecalupo & Perugia, 2013
 Joculator fuscus Cecalupo & Perugia, 2012
 Joculator gagulae Cecalupo & Perugia, 2018
 Joculator ganui Cecalupo & Perugia, 2018
 Joculator garianii Cecalupo & Perugia, 2013
 Joculator gemmae Cecalupo & Perugia, 2012
 Joculator giovanolii Cecalupo & Perugia, 2013
 Joculator gorini Cecalupo & Perugia, 2014
 Joculator goubini Cecalupo & Perugia, 2017
 Joculator gracilis Laseron, 1951
 Joculator granatus Kay, 1979
 Joculator granulosus Cecalupo & Perugia, 2013
 Joculator hadfieldae Cecalupo & Perugia, 2017
 Joculator hasegawai Cecalupo & Perugia, 2019
 Joculator hedleyi Laseron, 1951
 Joculator herosae Cecalupo & Perugia, 2012
 Joculator humilis Cecalupo & Perugia, 2012
 Joculator ianthinus Cecalupo & Perugia, 2013
 Joculator incisus Cecalupo & Perugia, 2012
 Joculator inflatus Cecalupo & Perugia, 2012
 Joculator introspectus Cotton, 1951
 Joculator iopuei Cecalupo & Perugia, 2017
 Joculator itiensis Cecalupo & Perugia, 2014
 Joculator jeffkinchi Cecalupo & Perugia, 2018
 Joculator johnkasui Cecalupo & Perugia, 2018
 Joculator juliuschani Cecalupo & Perugia, 2018
 Joculator kaipuae Cecalupo & Perugia, 2018
 Joculator kanoi Cecalupo & Perugia, 2013
 Joculator kenganziki Cecalupo & Perugia, 2018
 Joculator keratochroma Jay & Drivas, 2002
 Joculator kuboi Cecalupo & Perugia, 2019
 Joculator laguncula (Cecalupo & Perugia, 2012)
 Joculator laregnereensis Cecalupo & Perugia, 2017
 Joculator laseroni Jay & Drivas, 2002
 Joculator legallae Cecalupo & Perugia, 2014
 Joculator legoffi Cecalupo & Perugia, 2017
 Joculator lazzarii Cecalupo & Perugia, 2013
 Joculator leguyaderi Cecalupo & Perugia, 2013
 Joculator lividus Cecalupo & Perugia, 2012
 Joculator lokaroensis Cecalupo & Perugia, 2014
 Joculator lozoueti Jay & Drivas, 2002
 Joculator luteolus Cecalupo & Perugia, 2012
 † Joculator maestratii Lozouet, Lesport & Renard, 2001 
 Joculator magninensis Cecalupo & Perugia, 2017
 Joculator maloensis Cecalupo & Perugia, 2013
 Joculator manneensis Cecalupo & Perugia, 2018
 Joculator maranii Cecalupo & Perugia, 2014
 Joculator marinae Cecalupo & Perugia, 2014
 Joculator massimilianoi Cecalupo & Perugia, 2012
 Joculator mauberti Cecalupo & Perugia, 2018
 Joculator mbereensis Cecalupo & Perugia, 2017
 Joculator meanii Cecalupo & Perugia, 2014
 Joculator megacephala Jay & Drivas, 2002
 Joculator melania Laseron, 1956
 Joculator melanoraphis Jay & Drivas, 2002
 Joculator micalii Cecalupo & Perugia, 2012
 Joculator michoni Cecalupo & Perugia, 2018
 Joculator minimului Cecalupo & Perugia, 2018
 Joculator minimus Laseron, 1956
 Joculator minor Laseron, 1956
 Joculator minutissimus (Thiele, 1925)
 Joculator minutus Cecalupo & Perugia, 2012
 Joculator mitsuoi Cecalupo & Perugia, 2019
 Joculator modestus Cecalupo & Perugia, 2012
 Joculator morenae Cecalupo & Perugia, 2013
 Joculator morigii Cecalupo & Perugia, 2017
 Joculator murciai Cecalupo & Perugia, 2014
 Joculator mygaki Jay & Drivas, 2002
 Joculator myia Jay & Drivas, 2002
 Joculator nitidus Cecalupo & Perugia, 2012
 Joculator nucleus Cecalupo & Perugia, 2019
 Joculator obscurus Cecalupo & Perugia, 2012
 Joculator obsoletus Cecalupo & Perugia, 2012
 Joculator occultus Cecalupo & Perugia, 2012
 Joculator olivoideus Cecalupo & Perugia, 2018
 Joculator onnaensis Cecalupo & Perugia, 2019
 Joculator opulentus Cecalupo & Perugia, 2013
 Joculator ovatus Laseron, 1956
 Joculator pallidus Cecalupo & Perugia, 2012
 Joculator parvulus Cecalupo & Perugia, 2012
 Joculator pauxillus Cecalupo & Perugia, 2012
 Joculator perforatus Cecalupo & Perugia, 2013
 Joculator perlucidus Cecalupo & Perugia, 2012
 Joculator phtyr Jay & Drivas, 2002
 Joculator pinguis Cecalupo & Perugia, 2012
 Joculator pizzinii Cecalupo & Perugia, 2013
 Joculator priorai Cecalupo & Perugia, 2012
 Joculator problematicus Albano & Steger, 2021
 Joculator prunus Cecalupo & Perugia, 2013
 Joculator psyllos Jay & Drivas, 2002
 Joculator pulvis (Issel, 1869)
 Joculator pumilus Cecalupo & Perugia, 2018
 Joculator pupiformis Cecalupo & Perugia, 2012
 Joculator pygmaeus Cecalupo & Perugia, 2012
 Joculator quaggiottoi Cecalupo & Perugia, 2012
 Joculator ralijanoai Cecalupo & Perugia, 2014
 Joculator ralphmanai Cecalupo & Perugia, 2018
 Joculator rambellii Cecalupo & Perugia, 2018
 Joculator recisus Cecalupo & Perugia, 2012
 Joculator ridiculus (Watson, 1886)
 Joculator rolani Cecalupo & Perugia, 2012
 Joculator rubus Cecalupo & Perugia, 2013
 Joculator sabrinae Cecalupo & Perugia, 2012
 Joculator saguili Cecalupo & Perugia, 2013
 Joculator salvati Jay & Drivas, 2002
 Joculator sarahpezetae Cecalupo & Perugia, 2018
 Joculator schiaparellii Cecalupo & Perugia, 2017
 Joculator sekensis Cecalupo & Perugia, 2018
 Joculator semiperlucidus Cecalupo & Perugia, 2013
 Joculator simonsili Cecalupo & Perugia, 2018
 Joculator simulans Cecalupo & Perugia, 2012
 Joculator siwisikae Cecalupo & Perugia, 2018
 Joculator steykerae Cecalupo & Perugia, 2013
 Joculator stramineus Cecalupo & Perugia, 2013
 Joculator subconicus Cecalupo & Perugia, 2012
 Joculator subdolus Cecalupo & Perugia, 2012
 Joculator subglobosus Cecalupo & Perugia, 2013
 Joculator sublima Marshall, 1978
 Joculator subula Laseron, 1956
 Joculator succineus Cecalupo & Perugia, 2013
 Joculator sylviakinchae Cecalupo & Perugia, 2018
 Joculator tagliaferroi Cecalupo & Perugia, 2017
 Joculator testaceus Cecalupo & Perugia, 2013
 Joculator testii Cecalupo & Perugia, 2017
 Joculator theresae Cecalupo & Perugia, 2018
 Joculator thielei Jay & Drivas, 2002
 Joculator tieensis Cecalupo & Perugia, 2017
 Joculator tomacula Laseron, 1956
 Joculator tribulationis (Hedley, 1909)
 Joculator tsiriveloi Cecalupo & Perugia, 2014
 Joculator unicolor Cecalupo & Perugia, 2012
 Joculator uveanus  (Melvill & Standen, 1896)
 Joculator vandelae Cecalupo & Perugia, 2014
 Joculator variabilis Cecalupo & Perugia, 2012
 Joculator varians Laseron, 1956
 Joculator vassardi Cecalupo & Perugia, 2014
 Joculator vazzanai Cecalupo & Perugia, 2018
 Joculator venustus Cecalupo & Perugia, 2013
 Joculator vignali Jay & Drivas, 2002
 Joculator violaceus Cecalupo & Perugia, 2012
 Joculator voncoseli Cecalupo & Perugia, 2012
 Joculator websterae Cecalupo & Perugia, 2014
 Joculator ziliolii Cecalupo & Perugia, 2012

Taxa inquirenda
 Joculator aelomitres (Melvill & Standen, 1896) 
 Joculator marileutes (Melvill & Standen, 1896)

Species brought into synonymy
 Joculator albocinctum (Melvill & Standen, 1896): synonym of Costulopsis albocincta (Melvill & Standen, 1896)
 Joculator albula (Thiele, 1930): synonym of Joculator albulus (Thiele, 1930)
 Joculator caelata Powell, 1930: synonym of Synthopsis caelata (Powell, 1930)
 Joculator granata Kay, 1979: synonym of Nanopsis granata (Kay, 1979)
 Joculator introspecta Cotton, 1951: synonym of Joculator introspectus Cotton, 1951
 Joculator iohannae Cecalupo & Perugia, 2012: synonym of Synthopsis iohannae (Cecalupo & Perugia, 2012)
 Joculator minima Laseron, 1956: synonym of Joculator minimus Laseron, 1956
 Joculator minutissima (Thiele, 1925): synonym of Joculator minutissimus (Thiele, 1925)
 Joculator myia Jay & Drivas, 2002: synonym of Nanopsis myia (Jay & Drivas, 2002)
 Joculator nanus Laseron, 1951: synonym of Potenatomus nanus (Laseron, 1951)
 Joculator ovata Laseron, 1956: synonym of Joculator ovatus Laseron, 1956
 Joculator ridicula: synonym of Joculator ridiculus (Watson, 1886)
 Joculator semipicta (Gould, 1861): synonym of Joculator semipictus (Gould, 1861)
 Joculator semipictus (Gould, 1861): synonym of Horologica semipicta (Gould, 1861)
 Joculator skolix Jay & Drivas, 2002: synonym of Costulopsis skolix (Jay & Drivas, 2002) (original combination)
 Joculator turriger (Watson, 1886): synonym of Horologica turrigera (Watson, 1886)
 Joculator turrigera (Watson, 1886): synonym of Joculator turriger (Watson, 1886)
 Joculator uveanum (Melvill & Standen, 1896): synonym of Joculator uveanus (Melvill & Standen, 1896)

References

 Cecalupo A. & Perugia I. (2014). The Cerithiopsidae (Caenogastropoda: Triphoroidea) of South Madagascar (Indian Ocean). Bollettino Malacologico. 50: 75–126.

 
Gastropod genera